Savini is an Italian surname. Notable people with the surname include:

Filippo Savini (born 1985), Italian cyclist
Maurizio Savini, Italian sculptor
Mirko Savini (born 1979), Italian footballer
Tom Savini (born 1946), American actor, stuntman, director, and special effects and makeup artist
 Savini Tilakumara (born 2004) , Make-up artist and model

See also
Salvini (surname)

Italian-language surnames